August 1 - Eastern Orthodox liturgical calendar - August 3

All fixed commemorations below are observed on August 15 by Orthodox Churches on the Old Calendar.

For August 2, Orthodox Churches on the Old Calendar commemorate the Saints listed on July 20.

Saints

 Hieromartyr Stephen, Pope of Rome, and Companions (257)  (see also: August 3)
 Saint Phocas.
 Saint Friardus of Vindumitta in Gaul (c. 577)  (see also: August 1 - West)

Pre-Schism Western saints

 Martyr Rutilius (250)
 Saint Maximus of Padua, successor of St Prosdocimus as Bishop of Padua in Italy, Wonderworker (2nd century)
 Saint Auspicius, the first Bishop of Apt in France (pre-4th century)
 Saint Eusebius of Vercelli, Bishop of Vercelli in Piedmont in Italy (371)
 Saint Sidwell (Sativola), a Briton from the West of England near Exeter, she was beheaded as a martyr, by a scythe (6th century)
 Saint Boetharius (Betharius, Bethaire), Bishop of Chartres in France, he was present at the Council of Sens (623)
 Saint Etheldritha (Alfreda), daughter of King Offa of Mercia, an anchoress at Crowland in Lincolnshire in England (c. 835)
 Saint Plegmund, the tutor of King Alfred and twentieth Archbishop of Canterbury (914)

Post-Schism Orthodox saints

 Venerable Fotou the Cypriot (Photini the Cypriot), the Wonderworker.
 Blessed Basil of Kamenny Monastery, Lake Kubenskoye, Vologda (1472)
 Saint Marco of Belavinsk, in Vologda (1492)
 Blessed Basil of Moscow, Fool-for-Christ (1552)
 New Martyr Theodore of the Dardanelles (1690)

New martyrs and confessors

 New Hieromartyr Platon (Kolegov), Hieromonk, of Chasovo (Komi) (1937)

Other commemorations

 Translation of the relics (415) of the Righteous Nicodemus, Gamaliel, and Abibus, of Jerusalem (1st century)
 Translation of the relics from Jerusalem to Constantinople (428) of Protomartyr and Archdeacon Stephen (34)
 Translation of the relics of Martyrs Dada, Maximus, and Quintilian, at Dorostolum in Moesia (286)
 Consecration of the Church of St. John the Theologian, near the Holy Great Church in Constantinople.
 Repose of Hieromonk Peter (Seregin), spiritual father of Pühtitsa Convent, Estonia (1982)
 Icon of the Mother of God of Achair (2002)

Icon gallery

Notes

References

Sources
 August 2 / August 15. Orthodox Calendar (PRAVOSLAVIE.RU).
 August 15 / August 2. HOLY TRINITY RUSSIAN ORTHODOX CHURCH (A parish of the Patriarchate of Moscow).
 August 2. OCA - The Lives of the Saints.
 The Autonomous Orthodox Metropolia of Western Europe and the Americas (ROCOR). St. Hilarion Calendar of Saints for the year of our Lord 2004. St. Hilarion Press (Austin, TX). p. 57.
 Menologion: The Second Day of the Month of August. Orthodoxy in China.
 August 2. Latin Saints of the Orthodox Patriarchate of Rome.
 The Roman Martyrology. Transl. by the Archbishop of Baltimore. Last Edition, According to the Copy Printed at Rome in 1914. Revised Edition, with the Imprimatur of His Eminence Cardinal Gibbons. Baltimore: John Murphy Company, 1916. pp. 229–230.
 Rev. Richard Stanton. A Menology of England and Wales, or, Brief Memorials of the Ancient British and English Saints Arranged According to the Calendar, Together with the Martyrs of the 16th and 17th Centuries. London: Burns & Oates, 1892. p. 378.

 Greek Sources
 Great Synaxaristes:  2 ΑΥΓΟΥΣΤΟΥ. ΜΕΓΑΣ ΣΥΝΑΞΑΡΙΣΤΗΣ.
  Συναξαριστής. 2 Αυγούστου. ECCLESIA.GR. (H ΕΚΚΛΗΣΙΑ ΤΗΣ ΕΛΛΑΔΟΣ).

 Russian Sources
  15 августа (2 августа). Православная Энциклопедия под редакцией Патриарха Московского и всея Руси Кирилла (электронная версия). (Orthodox Encyclopedia - Pravenc.ru).

August in the Eastern Orthodox calendar